No Problem is an album by saxophonist Al Cohn recorded in 1979 for Xanadu Records.

Reception

Allmusic awarded the album 4 stars with its review by Scott Yanow stating "Tenor saxophonist's Al Cohn's Xanadu albums of 1975–80 found him at the peak of his powers. ... Recommended, as are all of Cohn's swinging and boppish Xanadu dates".

Track listing
 "Fred" (Neal Hefti) – 6:33
 "Danielle" (Al Cohn) – 6:52
 "All the Things You Are" (Jerome Kern, Oscar Hammerstein II) – 6:49
 "Zootcase" (Zoot Sims) – 4:49
 "Sophisticated Lady" (Duke Ellington, Irving Mills, Mitchell Parish) – 5:17
 "Mood Indigo" (Ellington, Barney Bigard, Mills) – 5:57
 "Three Little Words" (Harry Ruby, Bert Kalmar) – 6:09

Personnel 
 Al Cohn – tenor saxophone
 Barry Harris – piano 
Steve Gilmore – bass
Walter Bolden – drums

References

1980 albums
Xanadu Records albums
Al Cohn albums
Albums produced by Don Schlitten